Vladimir IV Rurikovich (1187 – 3 March 1239) was prince of Pereyaslavl (1206–1213), Smolensk (1213–1219) and Grand Prince of Kyiv (1223–1235). He was the son of Rurik Rostislavich.

External links 
Vitaliy Nagirnyy: Otoczenie księcia kijowskiego Włodzimierza Rurykowicza

1187 births
1239 deaths
Grand Princes of Kiev
13th-century princes in Kievan Rus'
Eastern Orthodox monarchs
Rostislavichi family (Smolensk)